There are about 123 species of fishes found naturally in Minnesota waters, including Lake Superior. The following list is based on the Minnesota Department of Natural Resources.

The species data on this page is taken from the Minnesota DNR, which also uses several labels to indicate a fish's status within Minnesota waters. An endangered fish species is  near extinction in Minnesota, a threatened species is likely to become endangered within the foreseeable future, and a special concern species is either extremely uncommon in Minnesota or has unique or highly specific habitat requirements.

Several types of Minnesota fish are considered non-native invasive species. A prohibited invasive species is illegal to possess in Minnesota without a  permit, and a regulated invasive species is legal to possess but still may not be released into public waters. Many invasive fish species are nonetheless already well-established.

Coldwater sport fish
Atlantic salmon	Salmo salar
Bloater Coregonus hoyi
Brook trout Salvelinus fontinalis
Brown trout Salmo trutta
Cisco Coregonus artedi commonly called "tulibee" or "lake herring"
Chinook salmon	Oncorhynchus tshawytscha
Coho salmon	Oncorhynchus kisutch
Kiyi	Coregonus kiyi (special concern)
Lake trout Salvelinus namaycush
Lake whitefish Coregonus clupeaformis
Pink salmon	Oncorhynchus gorbuscha
Pygmy whitefish	Prosopium coulterii
Rainbow smelt	Osmerus mordax (regulated invasive)
Rainbow trout Oncorhynchus mykiss
Round whitefish	Prosopium cylindraceum
Shortjaw cisco	Coregonus zenithicus (special concern)

legal game fish MN
Black bullhead Ameiurus melas
Black crappie	Pomoxis nigromaculatus
Blue catfish	Ictalurus furcatus
Bluegill Lepomis macrochirus
Blue sucker	Cycleptus elongatus (special concern)
Brown bullhead Ameiurus nebulosus
Burbot Lota lota may be referred to as "eelpout," "ling," or "lawyer"
Channel catfish Ictalurus punctatus
Flathead catfish Pylodictis olivaris
Green sunfish Lepomis cyanellus
Lake sturgeon Acipenser fulvescens (special concern)
Largemouth bass Micropterus salmoides
Longear sunfish Lepomis megalotis
Muskellunge Esox masquinongy
Northern pike Esox lucius
American paddlefish	Polyodon spathula  (threatened)
Pumpkinseed Lepomis gibbosus
Rock bass	Ambloplites rupestris
Sauger Sander canadense
Shovelnose sturgeon Scaphirhynchus platorynchus
Smallmouth bass Micropterus dolomieu
Walleye Sander vitreus
Warmouth	Lepomis gulosus
White bass	Morone chrysops
White crappie Pomoxis annularis
White perch Morone americana (prohibited invasive)
Yellow bass Morone mississippiensis (special concern)
Yellow bullhead Ameiurus natalis
Yellow perch Perca flavescens

Other sport fish
American eel	Anguilla rostrata
Bigmouth buffalo Ictiobus cyprinellus
Black buffalo	Ictiobus niger (special concern)
Black redhorse	Moxostoma duquesnei
Bowfin Amia calva sometimes call "dogfish"
Common carp Cyprinus carpio (regulated invasive)
Creek chub	Semotilus atromaculatus
Freshwater drum Aplodinotus grunniens often called "sheepshead"
Gizzard shad Dorosoma cepedianum
Golden redhorse	Moxostoma erythrurum
Goldeye	Hiodon alosoides
Goldfish	Carassius auratus (regulated invasive)
Greater redhorse	Moxostoma valenciennesi
Highfin carpsucker	Carpiodes velifer
Longnose gar Lepisosteus osseus
Longnose sucker	Catostomus catostomus
Mooneye	Hiodon tergisus
Northern hogsucker	Hypentelium nigricans
Quillback	Carpiodes cyprinus
River carpsucker	Carpiodes carpio
River redhorse	Moxostoma carinatum
Shorthead redhorse	Moxostoma macrolepidotum
Shortnose gar	Lepisosteus platostomus
Silver redhorse	Moxostoma anisurum
Smallmouth buffalo	Ictiobus bubalus
Spotted sucker	Minytrema melanops
White sucker Catostomus commersoni

Non-game fish
Alewife	Alosa pseudoharengus (prohibited invasive)
Allegheny pearl dace	Margariscus margarita
American brook lamprey	Lampetra appendix
Banded darter	Etheostoma zonale
Banded killifish	Fundulus diaphanus
Bighead carp Hypophthalmichthys nobilis (prohibited invasive)
Bigmouth shiner	Notropis dorsalis
Blackchin shiner	Notropis heterodon
Blacknose shiner	Notropis heterolepis
Blackside darter	Percina maculata
Bluntnose darter	Etheostoma chlorosoma
Bluntnose minnow	Pimephales notatus
Brassy minnow	Hybognathus hankinsoni
Brook silverside	Labidesthes sicculus
Brook stickleback	Culaea inconstans
Bullhead minnow	Pimephales vigilax
Central mudminnow	Umbra limi
Central stoneroller	Campostoma anomalum
Chestnut lamprey	Ichthyomyzon castaneus
Common shiner	Luxilus cornutus
Crystal darter	Crystallaria asprella (special concern)
Deepwater sculpin	Myoxocephalus thompsoni
Eastern blacknose dace Rhinichthys atratulus
Emerald shiner	Notropis atherinoides
Fantail darter	Etheostoma flabellare
Fathead minnow	Pimephales promelas
Finescale dace	Phoxinus neogaeus
Flathead chub	Platygobio gracilis
Fourspine stickleback	Apeltes quadracus
Gilt darter	Percina evides (special concern)
Golden shiner	Notemigonus crysoleucas
Grass carp		Ctenopharyngodon idella (prohibited invasive)
Gravel chub	Erimystax x-punctatus (special concern)
Hornyhead chub	Nocomis biguttatus
Iowa darter	Etheostoma exile
Lake chub	Couesius plumbeus
Largescale stoneroller	Campostoma oligolepis
Johnny darter	Etheostoma nigrum
Least darter	Etheostoma microperca (special concern)
Logperch	Percina caprodes
Longnose dace	Rhinichthys cataractae
Mimic shiner	Notropis volucellus
Mississippi silvery minnow	Hybognathus nuchalis
Mottled sculpin Cottus bairdi sometimes called "Muddler Minnow" 
Mud darter	Etheostoma asprigene
Ninespine stickleback Pungitius pungitius
Northern brook lamprey Ichthyomyzon fossor (special concern)
Northern pearl dace	Margariscus nachtriebi
Northern redbelly dace Phoxinus eos
Orangespotted sunfish Lepomis humilis
Ozark minnow	Notropis nubilus (special concern)
Pallid shiner	Hybopsis amnis (special concern)
Pirate perch	Aphredoderus sayanus (special concern)
Plains topminnow	Fundulus sciadicus (special concern)
Pugnose minnow	Opsopoeodus emiliae (special concern)
Pugnose shiner	Notropis anogenus
Rainbow darter	Etheostoma caeruleum
Red shiner	Cyprinella lutrensis
Redfin shiner	Lythrurus umbratilis
Redside dace	Clinostomus elongatus
River darter	Percina shumardi
River shiner	Notropis blennius
Rosyface shiner	Notropis rubellus
Round goby	Neogobius melanostomus (prohibited invasive)
Ruffe	Gymnocephalus cernuus (prohibited invasive)
Sand shiner	Notropis stramineus
Sea lamprey	Petromyzon marinus (prohibited invasive)
Silver carp	Hypophthalmichthys molitrix (prohibited invasive)
Silver chub	Macrhybopsis storeriana or Hybopsis storeriana
Silver lamprey	Ichthyomyzon unicuspis
Skipjack herring	Alosa chrysochloris (special concern)
Slender madtom	Noturus exilis (special concern)
Slenderhead darter	Percina phoxocephala
Slimy sculpin	Cottus cognatus
Southern brook lamprey	Ichthyomyzon gagei (special concern)
Southern redbelly dace	Phoxinus erythrogaster
Speckled chub	Macrhybopsis aestivalis or Hybopsis aestivalis
Spoonhead sculpin	Cottus ricei
Spotfin shiner	Cyprinella spiloptera
Spottail shiner	Notropis hudsonius
Starhead topminnow	Fundulus dispar
Stonecat	Noturus flavus
Suckermouth minnow	Phenacobius mirabilis
Tadpole madtom	Noturus gyrinus
Threespine stickleback	Gasterosteus aculeatus
Topeka shiner	Notropis topeka (special concern)
Trout-perch	Percopsis omiscomaycus
Western tubenose goby	Proterorhinus semilunaris
Weed shiner	Notropis texanus
Western blacknose dace	Rhinichthys obtusus
Western sand darter	Ammocrypta clara

Invasive species not currently in Minnesota
According to the DNR, these prohibited or regulated invasive fish species threaten Minnesota natural resources but are not currently known to be in Minnesota public waters.

Black carp Mylopharyngodon piceus (prohibited invasive)
Rudd Scardinius erythrophthalmus (prohibited invasive)
Tilapia Oreochromis, Sarotherodon, and Tilapia spp. (regulated invasive)
Zander Stizostedion lucioperca (prohibited invasive)

See also
List of Minnesota rivers
List of lakes in Minnesota
List of fish families
List of U.S. state fish
List of fish common names

References
Minnesota DNR Fish Watch List
Minnesota State Parks Fish Species List
Minnesota DNR Endangered Fish
Minnesota DNR Invasive Species

Dickson, Tom. "The Great Minnesota Fish Book" (University of Minnesota Press, 2008). From walleye to bowfin to stickleback—vivid and entertaining profiles of Minnesota's many different fishes, illustrated by renowned fish artist Joseph Tomelleri. http://www.upress.umn.edu/Books/D/dickson_great.html

Fish
Minnesota
.Minnesota
.Minnesota